Gongylosoma nicobariensis is a species of snake found in the Nicobar Islands of India. Species known only from its holotype.

Description
Rostral low, wide, not reaching the top of the head; nostril between two nasals; internasals about half the size of the prefrontals ; frontal somewhat larger than the supraoculars; parietals about one fourth larger than the frontal, in contact with both post-oculars ; loreal united with the postnasal; one pre- and two post-oculars ; temporals short 1+2 (Smith, 1943 gives 2+2); upper labials 7, third and fourth entering the eye; both pairs of chin-shields subequal in size. Scales in 17 rows. Ventrals 189; anal 2 divided; subcaudals 87 (Smith gives 84). Anterior half of the body reddish brown above, posterior blackish grey; head above blackish, the three first labials with yellow spots; a short broad yellow streak from behind and below the eye posteriorly to the angle of the mouth; a black collar, margined on both sides with an interrupted yellow band, of which the anterior is the most distinct; an indistinct series of blackish-grey dorsal spots, almost forming a dark undulating band; sides marbled and freckled blackish grey, this colour being separated from the upper brown one by a series of closely set black spots which are partially conspicuous on the posterior part of the body: chin dusky; lower parts yellow with a vermilion tinge, each ventral with a large black spot near its outer extremity.
Total length 17.3 inches; tail 4.2.

Location: Camorta in Nicobar Islands

Notes

References
 Das, I. 1999 Biogeography of the amphibians and reptiles of the Andaman and Nicobar Islands, India. In: Ota,H. (ed) Tropical Island herpetofauna.., Elsevier, pp. 43–77
 Smith, M. A. 1943. Fauna of British India. Reptila and Batrachia. p. 185
 Stoliczka, F. 1870 Observations on some Indian and Malayan Amphibia and Reptilia. J. Asiat. Soc. Bengal, Calcutta, 39:134-228.
 Stoliczka, F. 1870 Observations of some Indian and Malayan Amphibia and Reptilia. Ann. Mag. Nat. Hist. (4) 6: 105-109

External links
 

Colubrids
Taxa named by Ferdinand Stoliczka
Reptiles described in 1870